The men's snowboard cross competition of the FIS Snowboarding World Championships 2013 was held at Stoneham-et-Tewkesbury, Québec, Canada between January 24 and 26, 2011.

The qualification round was completed on January 24, while the elimination round was completed on January 26.

Medalists

Results

Qualification

Elimination round

1/8 Finals

The top 48 qualifiers advanced to the 1/8 finals. From here, they participated in six-person elimination races, with the top three from each race advancing. 

Heat 1

Heat 2

Heat 3

Heat 4

Heat 5

Heat 6

Heat 7

Heat 8

Quarterfinals

Heat 1

Heat 2

Heat 3

Heat 4

Semifinals

Heat 1

Heat 2

Finals

Small Finals

Big Finals

References

2013 FIS Snowboard World Championships